A microbiological culture, or microbial culture, is a method of multiplying microbial organisms by letting them reproduce in predetermined culture medium under controlled laboratory conditions. Microbial cultures are foundational and basic diagnostic methods used as a research tool in molecular biology.

The term culture can also refer to the microorganisms being grown.

Microbial cultures are used to determine the type of organism, its abundance in the sample being tested, or both. It is one of the primary diagnostic methods of microbiology and used as a tool to determine the cause of infectious disease by letting the agent multiply in a predetermined medium. For example, a throat culture is taken by scraping the lining of tissue in the back of the throat and blotting the sample into a medium to be able to screen for harmful microorganisms, such as Streptococcus pyogenes, the causative agent of strep throat. Furthermore, the term culture is more generally used informally to refer to "selectively growing" a specific kind of microorganism in the lab.

It is often essential to isolate a pure culture of microorganisms. A pure (or axenic) culture is a population of cells or multicellular organisms growing in the absence of other species or types. A pure culture may originate from a single cell or single organism, in which case the cells are genetic clones of one another. For the purpose of gelling the microbial culture, the medium of agarose gel (agar) is used. Agar is a gelatinous substance derived from seaweed. A cheap substitute for agar is guar gum, which can be used for the isolation and maintenance of thermophiles.

Bacterial culture 

There are several types of bacterial culture methods that are selected based on the agent being cultured and the downstream use.

Broth cultures

One method of bacterial culture is liquid culture, in which the desired bacteria are suspended in a liquid nutrient medium, such as Luria Broth, in an upright flask. This allows a scientist to grow up large amounts of bacteria for a variety of downstream applications.

Liquid cultures are ideal for preparation of an antimicrobial assay in which the experimenter inoculates liquid broth with bacteria and lets it grow overnight (they may use a shaker for uniform growth). Then they would take aliquots of the sample to test for the antimicrobial activity of a specific drug or protein (antimicrobial peptides).

As an alternative, the microbiologist may decide to use static liquid cultures. These cultures are not shaken and they provide the microbes with an oxygen gradient.

Agar plates 
Microbiological cultures can be grown in petri dishes of differing sizes that have a thin layer of agar-based growth medium. Once the growth medium in the petri dish is inoculated with the desired bacteria, the plates are incubated at the optimal temperature for the growing of the selected bacteria (for example, usually at 37 degrees Celsius, or the human body temperature, for cultures from humans or animals, or lower for environmental cultures). After the desired level of growth is achieved, agar plates can be stored upside down in a refrigerator for an extended period of time to keep bacteria for future experiments.

There are a variety of additives that can be added to agar before it is poured into a plate and allowed to solidify. Some types of bacteria can only grow in the presence of certain additives. This can also be used when creating engineered strains of bacteria that contain an antibiotic-resistance gene. When the selected antibiotic is added to the agar, only bacterial cells containing the gene insert conferring resistance will be able to grow. This allows the researcher to select only the colonies that were successfully transformed.

Agar based dipsticks 
Miniaturised version of agar plates implemented to dipstick formats, eg. Dip Slide, Digital Dipstick  show potential to be used at the point-of-care for diagnosis purposes. They have advantages over agar plates since they are cost effective and their operation does not require expertise or laboratory environment, which enable them to be used at the point-of-care.

Stab cultures 

Stab cultures are similar to agar plates, but are formed by solid agar in a test tube. Bacteria is introduced via an inoculation needle or a pipette tip being stabbed into the center of the agar. Bacteria grow in the punctured area. Stab cultures are most commonly used for short-term storage or shipment of cultures.

Culture collections 
Microbial culture collections focus on the acquisition, authentication, production, preservation, catalogueing and distribution of viable cultures of standard reference microorganisms, cell lines and other materials for research in microbial systematics. Culture collection are also repositories of type strains.

Solid plate culture of thermophilic microorganisms

For solid plate cultures of thermophilic microorganisms such as Bacillus acidocaldarius, Bacillus stearothermophilus, Thermus aquaticus and Thermus thermophilus etc. growing at temperatures of 50 to 70 degrees C, low acyl clarified gellan gum has been proven to be the preferred gelling agent comparing to agar for the counting or isolation or both of the above thermophilic bacteria.

Viral culture

Virus and phage cultures require host cells in which the virus or phage multiply. For bacteriophages, cultures are grown by infecting bacterial cells. The phage can then be isolated from the resulting plaques in a lawn of bacteria on a plate. Viral cultures are obtained from their appropriate eukaryotic host cells. The streak plate method is a way to physically separate the microbial population, and is done by spreading the inoculate back and forth with an inoculating loop over the solid agar plate. Upon incubation, colonies will arise and single cells will have been isolated from the biomass. Once a microorganism has been isolated in pure culture, it is necessary to preserve it in a viable state for further study and use in cultures called stock cultures. These cultures have to be maintained, such that there is no loss of their biological, immunological and cultural characters.

Eukaryotic cell culture

Isolation of pure cultures 

For single-celled eukaryotes, such as yeast, the isolation of pure cultures uses the same techniques as for bacterial cultures. Pure cultures of multicellular organisms are often more easily isolated by simply picking out a single individual to initiate a culture. This is a useful technique for pure culture of fungi, multicellular algae, and small metazoa, for example.

Developing pure culture techniques is crucial to the observation of the specimen in question. The most common method to isolate individual cells and produce a pure culture is to prepare a streak plate. The streak plate method is a way to physically separate the microbial population, and is done by spreading the inoculate back and forth with an inoculating loop over the solid agar plate. Upon incubation, colonies will arise and single cells will have been isolated from the biomass. Once a microorganism has been isolated in pure culture, it is necessary to preserve it in a viable state for further study and use. Stock cultures have to be maintained, such that there is no loss of their biological, immunological and cultural characters.

See also 
 Colony-forming unit
Blood culture
 Microbial dark matter
 Microbial Food Cultures
 Screening cultures
 Sputum culture
 Synchronous culture
 Gellan gum

References

External links 

 EFFCA - European Food and Feed Cultutes Association. Information about production and uses of microbial cultures as well as legislative aspects.

 
Microbiology terms
Cell culture